Polaris is the twelfth studio album by power metal band Stratovarius, released on 15 May 2009. It is the first Stratovarius album to feature bassist Lauri Porra and guitarist Matias Kupiainen, following former bassist Jari Kainulainen's departure from the band in 2005 and former guitarist Timo Tolkki's departure in 2008.

Timo Kotipelto, who at the time of Polaris''' release had been a member of Stratovarius the longest (since 1994) among the current members, considered Polaris to be "the album that saved the band" and said that "without it there would not be any Stratovarius." More time passed between the release of Stratovarius' eponymous album Stratovarius in 2005 and the release of Polaris than between any other two consecutive albums released by the band. Stratovarius in 2006 had recorded a demo album called Revolution Renaissance, performed one Revolution Renaissance song live in August 2007 ("Last Night on Earth") and according to Kotipelto had intended to release a completed version of the album in 2008. However, the songs of that album were re-recorded and released in 2008 as New Era, the first album of Tolkki's new band, Revolution Renaissance, which acquired the album's prior name.Polaris reached No. 2 on the Finnish albums chart, as well as reaching the top 70 in five other countries.. (in Italian). FIMI. 2009. Archived from the original on 2012-04-04. Retrieved 2014-01-09. "Deep Unknown" was released as a single, reaching No. 20 on the Finnish singles chart. In its first week of release, the album sold around 800 copies in the U.S.

Track listing

Personnel
Stratovarius
Timo Kotipelto – lead vocals, background vocals, production
Matias Kupiainen – guitar, background vocals, engineering (vocals, guitar, bass), production
Jens Johansson – keyboard, background vocals, engineering, production
Jörg Michael – drums, production
Lauri Porra – bass, background vocals, production

Additional credits
Seppo Rautasuo – strings (track 11)
Heikki Hämäläinen – strings (track 11)
Heikki Vehmanen – strings (track 11)
Kari Lindstedt – strings (track 11)
Perttu Vänskä – strings arrangement (tracks 1, 8), strings programming (tracks 1, 8), engineering (acoustic guitar; track 11), additional Pro Tools editing
Pessi Levanto – strings arrangement (track 11)
Alexi Parviainen – background vocals
Marko Waara – background vocals
Tipe Johnson – background vocals
Tony Kakko – background vocals
Tommi Vainikainen – engineering (strings; track 11)
Mikko Karmila – mixing
Mikko Raita – mixing (track 11)
Svante Forsbäck – mastering

Release history
Following Polaris' original release, a Digipak edition was reissued on 21 May 2010, containing a bonus disc of live recordings from the 2009–10 Polaris'' world tour.

Chart performance

Album

Singles

References

External links
Polaris at stratovarius.com

Stratovarius albums
2009 albums
Edel AG albums
Victor Entertainment albums